Wojciech (Wojtek) Zbijewski is an American biomedical engineering and medical physics working in the fields of Computed tomography  (CT), Cone beam computed tomography (CBCT), image reconstruction in CT, and applications of CT and CBCT in orthopedics.
He is faculty at the Department of Biomedical Engineering at Johns Hopkins School of Medicine.

Biography 
Zbijewski did his undergraduate studies at Dept. of Physics at the University of Warsaw  where he received his Master of Science degree in the Laboratory of Biomedical Physics. He then joined the Image Sciences Institute at Utrecht University, where he obtained a doctoral degree with a thesis on statistical image reconstruction and artifact correction in Computed tomography.

After several years in industry, Zbijewski joined Johns Hopkins School of Medicine where he is now faculty in Department of Biomedical Engineering.

Work 
Zbijewski research is focused on Computed tomography system optimization, algorithm development, and clinical applications, including contributions in Iterative reconstruction, artifact correction, weight-bearing CBCT of the extremities, and new CBCT systems and algorithms for high-resolution quantitative imaging of bone health,

References 

Living people
Johns Hopkins Biomedical Engineering faculty
Polish engineers
University of Warsaw alumni
Year of birth missing (living people)